Chang'an District is the second-most populous of 11 urban districts of the prefecture-level city of Xi'an, the capital of Shaanxi Province, in Northwest China. The district borders the prefecture-level cities of Shangluo to the southeast and Ankang to the southwest, Weiyang and Yanta Districts to the north, Baqiao District to the northeast, Lantian County to the east, and Huyi District to the west.

Administrative divisions
As 2020, Chang'an District is divided to 25 subdistricts.
Subdistricts

References

External links

Districts of Xi'an